Kyle James Stephens (born 1955/56) is a Republican former member of the Nevada Assembly. He was appointed to replace Erven T. Nelson, who resigned.

Biography
Stephens graduated from Brigham Young University and serves as an account representative for Brady Industries. Following Nelson's resignation, he was appointed to the Assembly in September 2016 by the Clark County Commission for the 2016 special session. He was selected unanimously over former assemblyman R. Garn Mabey and businessman Ron Coury.

Stephens did not stand for election in November 2016 and was succeeded by Democrat Brittney Miller.

Personal life
Stephens and his wife, Julia, have three children; Justin, Deven, and Diana.

References

External links
 

1956 births
Brigham Young University alumni
Living people
Republican Party members of the Nevada Assembly
People from Scotia, California
Politicians from Las Vegas
21st-century American politicians